The 2021–22 international cricket season took place from September 2021 to April 2022. 29 Tests, 111 One Day Internationals (ODIs), 112 Twenty20 Internationals (T20Is), 25 Women's One Day Internationals (WODIs), 40 Women's Twenty20 Internationals (WT20Is), and two women's Test matches were scheduled to be played during this period. Additionally, a number of other T20I/WT20I matches were also scheduled to be played in series involving associate nations.

The 2021 ICC Men's T20 World Cup, the 2021 Women's Cricket World Cup Qualifier and the 2022 Women's Cricket World Cup were played in October 2021, December 2021, and March 2022 respectively, after they were all postponed due to the COVID-19 pandemic. In the final of the Men's T20 World Cup, Australia beat New Zealand by eight wickets to win their first T20 World Cup. In the final of the Women's World Cup, Australia beat England by 71 runs to win their seventh World Cup.

Qualification for the 2023 ICC Women's T20 World Cup also continued, with four more regional qualifiers taking place. In August 2021, England's planned tour of Bangladesh was postponed until 2023 due to the ongoing Covid situation and fixture congestion. Later the same month, Afghanistan's planned ODI series against Pakistan was postponed due to the situation in Afghanistan and the logistics in travelling. In November 2021, Cricket Australia officially postponed the one-off Test match between Australia and Afghanistan, due to the Taliban not supporting women's cricket.

In September 2021, New Zealand arrived in Pakistan to play three ODIs and five T20I matches. It was New Zealand's first tour of Pakistan since 2003. However, on the morning of the first ODI match, New Zealand Cricket (NZC) raised a security alert with the Pakistan Cricket Board (PCB) and the Pakistan Government, which resulted in the entire tour being called off. England were also scheduled to tour Pakistan for the first time in sixteen years to play two T20I matches. However, following New Zealand's tour being called off, the England and Wales Cricket Board (ECB) announced that the men's tour and the women's tour to the country in October 2021 had both been cancelled, due to concerns of travelling to the region.

In October, the Zimbabwe women's cricket team played their first ever WODI matches since they were granted WODI status by the International Cricket Council (ICC) in April 2021. They hosted a four-match series against Ireland, with Zimbabwe winning the first fixture.

In late November 2021, a new variant of the COVID-19 virus was discovered in southern Africa. As a result, the 2021 Women's Cricket World Cup Qualifier in Zimbabwe and the Dutch cricket team's tour of South Africa were called off. Most of the group stage matches in the Women's Cricket World Cup Qualifier had taken place, with only the first ODI between South Africa and the Netherlands being played. The eighth round of the 2019–2023 ICC Cricket World Cup League 2 in Namibia was also called off after only two of the scheduled eight matches had been played. In December 2021, the ODI matches between Pakistan and the West Indies were postponed following multiple cases of COVID-19 in the West Indies team and support staff. Later the same month, Ireland's ODI matches against the United States were also cancelled following positive COVID-19 cases in both teams.

In December 2021 and January 2022, the 72nd Ashes series was played. Australia successfully retained the Ashes by winning the first three Test matches. The fourth Test ended in a draw, with Australia winning the fifth Test by 146 runs to win the series 4–0. Later in January 2022, New Zealand's tour of Australia was postponed due to the uncertainty of the quarantine rules for when the New Zealand team returned home. The following month, Australia's tour of New Zealand was called off due no managed isolation quarantine (MIQ) spots available for the Australian team.

On 5 February 2022, India won the 2022 ICC Under-19 Cricket World Cup to win their fifth title. The following day, in their home series against the West Indies, India's senior men's team played their 1,000th ODI match, becoming the first team to play one thousand matches in that format.

Season overview

Rankings

The following were the rankings at the beginning of the season.

On-going tournaments
The following were the rankings at the beginning of the season.

September

New Zealand in Bangladesh

Afghanistan in Pakistan

The tour was postponed due to the situation in Afghanistan, the logistics in travelling, and for the welfare of the team.

South Africa in Sri Lanka

Papua New Guinea vs United States in Oman

Papua New Guinea vs Nepal in Oman

2021 Oman Tri-Nation Series (round 6)

New Zealand in Pakistan

The tour was called off ahead of the first ODI due to security concerns.

India women in Australia

2021 Oman Tri-Nation Series (round 7)

England in Bangladesh
In August 2021, the tour was postponed due to fixture congestion and the ongoing Covid pandemic, with the series rescheduled for March 2023.

October

2021 Summer T20 Bash

Ireland women in Zimbabwe

Sri Lanka in Oman

England women in Pakistan

The tour was cancelled due to concerns of travelling to the region.

England in Pakistan

The tour was cancelled due to concerns of travelling to the region.

2021 ICC Men's T20 World Cup

Super 12

Finals

November

West Indies women in Pakistan

Bangladesh women in Zimbabwe

New Zealand in India

Pakistan in Bangladesh

West Indies in Sri Lanka

2021 Women's Cricket World Cup Qualifier

The tournament was called-off midway through due to the COVID-19 pandemic.

Super Six

2021 Namibia Tri-Nation Series

The series was called off after the first two matches due to the COVID-19 pandemic.

Netherlands in South Africa

The second and third ODIs were postponed due to the COVID-19 pandemic.

Afghanistan in Australia

In September 2021, Cricket Tasmania confirmed that the match would not be taking place following the Taliban offensive in Afghanistan, due to the Taliban not supporting women's cricket.

December

England in Australia

West Indies in Pakistan

The ODI matches were postponed following multiple cases of COVID-19 the West Indies team and support staff.

Ireland in United States

On 28 December 2021, the ODI matches were cancelled after a number of positive COVID-19 cases from both teams.

India in South Africa

January

Bangladesh in New Zealand

Ireland in West Indies

Zimbabwe in Sri Lanka

2022 ICC Under-19 Cricket World Cup

England women in Australia

Netherlands vs Afghanistan in Qatar

England in West Indies

West Indies women in South Africa

New Zealand in Australia
On 19 January 2022, the tour was postponed due to uncertainty of the New Zealand players' quarantine requirements when they return home.

February

UAE in Oman

West Indies in India

India women in New Zealand

Sri Lanka in Australia

South Africa in New Zealand

Afghanistan in Bangladesh

Sri Lanka in India

Afghanistan in Zimbabwe
The tour was postponed in January 2022, after Zimbabwe Cricket could not secure all the broadcasting services including the Decision Review System.

March

2022 Women's Cricket World Cup

Australia in Pakistan

2022 United Arab Emirates Tri-Nation Series (round 9)

2022 United Arab Emirates Tri-Nation Series (round 10)

Australia in New Zealand

The series was abandoned due to no managed isolation and quarantine (MIQ) availability for the Australian team.

Bangladesh in South Africa

Netherlands in New Zealand

Papua New Guinea in Nepal

Afghanistan in India

April

2022 Papua New Guinea Tri-Nation Series

See also
 Associate international cricket in 2021–22

Notes

References

2021 in cricket
2022 in cricket